East Avenue Tabernacle Associate Reformed Presbyterian Church, also known as the Great Aunt Stella Center, is a historic Associate Reformed Presbyterian church located at 927 Elizabeth Street in Charlotte, Mecklenburg County, North Carolina.  It was designed by architect James M. McMichael in a Classical Revival style.  It consists of a two-story sanctuary, built in 1914, and a four-story educational wing added to the south side of the sanctuary in 1925. The sanctuary has a Greek cross plan with a central octagon with shallow two-story wings that terminate in low parapeted walls.  The sanctuary is topped by a copper dome and has a monumental porch with a brick pediment.  In 1998 East Avenue Tabernacle merged with the Craig Avenue Associate Reformed Presbyterian Church. Ultimately the church became the Craig Avenue Tabernacle A.R.P. Church. Thus ironically through the years the name changed from East to Craig Avenue. The building now houses a community center and charter school.

It was added to the National Register of Historic Places in 2005.

References

External links
Great Aunt Stella Center website

Churches in Charlotte, North Carolina
Presbyterian churches in North Carolina
Churches on the National Register of Historic Places in North Carolina
Neoclassical architecture in North Carolina
Churches completed in 1914
20th-century Presbyterian church buildings in the United States
National Register of Historic Places in Mecklenburg County, North Carolina
Associate Reformed Presbyterian Church
Neoclassical church buildings in the United States